Nazampur  is a village in Kapurthala district of Punjab State, India. The village is administrated by a Sarpanch, who is an elected representative.

Demography 
According to the report published by Census India in 2011, Nazampur has 65 houses with the total population of 365 persons of which 204 are male and 161 females. Literacy rate of  Nazampur is 89.44%, higher than the state average of 75.84%.  The population of children in the age group 0–6 years is 24 which is 6.58% of the total population.  Child sex ratio is approximately 1000, higher than the state average of 846.

Population data

Nearby villages  
 Boot
 Paharipur
 Rupanpur
 Subhanpur
 Bajola
 Randhawa
 Shahpur Pira
 Hambowal
 Gaji Gudana
 Ghuluwal
 Fattu Chak

References

External links
  Villages in Kapurthala
 Kapurthala Villages List

Villages in Kapurthala district